Middle Creek High School is located 123 Middle Creek Park Avenue of Cary, North Carolina, with a mailing address of Apex. It is one of six public high schools in Cary and is part of the Wake County Public School System.

History 
Middle Creek High School opened on August 26, 2002. However, the previous year, it was used by Athens Drive High School while it was being remodeled. The school opened with juniors and seniors, adding freshmen and sophomores the next year.

Student Population 
In the 2021-2022 school year, the student enrollment was 1,886. The student population is 52% male and 48% female. The student body is 58.7% White, 21.2% Hispanic, 14.5% Black, 3% two or more races, 2.3% Asian, .2% American Indian, and .1% Hawaiian/Pacific Islander—for a total minority population of 41.3%.

Of those students, 20% are economically disadvantaged with 17% eligible for the free lunch program and 3% eligible for the reduced-price lunch program.

The student graduation rate is 94%. Based on test scores, 50.2% of the students are ready for college.

Faculty 
The faculty consists of 103.74 full-time equivalent teachers. The ratio of students to teachers is 18:1. 99% of the teachers have three or more years experience. In addition 95% of teachers are certified. 

There is one counselor for every 285 students or a ratio of 285:1. The faculty also includes a social worker.

Academics

Curriculum 
Middle Creek High School includes grades 9 through 12. The school offers Advanced Placement® courses, with 62% of students participating. In addition, 61% of the students passed at least one AP® Exam. 59% of the school's students take the SAT, with an average score of 1160. However 73% of the school's graduates pursue either college or vocational training.

Rankings 
As of 2022, U.S. News & World Report ranks Middle Creek High School 12th amongst the high schools in Wake County, North Carolina. It is also ranked 76th in North Carolina, and 2,780 in the nation. Niche gives the school an "A" rating and places the school at #57 in North Carolina.

Academic honors 
Juniors and seniors with a qualifying GPA can apply to join the National Honor Society.

Library 
The school's media center has a staff of two.

Student life

Publications 
The online student newspaper is called The Creek Flow. The school also publishes a yearbook.

Athletics

Mascot 
Middle Creek High School's mascot is the Mustang.

School Colors 
The school colors a black, red, and white.

Sports teams 
Middle Creek High School has the following co-ed sports teams: varsity cheerleading, junior varsity cheerleading, cross country, indoor track, swim, and track.

Sports teams for women include varsity basketball, junior varsity basketball, golf, gymnastics, varsity lacrosse, junior varsity lacrosse, varsity soccer, junior varsity soccer, varsity softball, junior varsity softball, stunt, varsity tennis, varsity volleyball, and junior varsity volleyball.

Men's sports teams include: varsity baseball, junior varsity baseball, varsity basketball, junior varsity basketball, varsity football, junior varsity football, golf, varsity lacrosse, junior varsity lacrosse, varsity soccer, junior varsity soccer, varsity tennis, and wrestling.

State championships 

 2012, 2017, & 2022 4A State Men's Lacrosse Champions 

 2012 & 2023 4A State Baseball Champions 
 Cheerleading 5 state championships, 4 national championships

Hall of Fame 
In 2013, the first class was inducted into the Middle Creek School Athletic Hall of Fame. Candidates for inclusion are alumni athletes, athletic trainers, coaches, community members, school officials, or Stampede Club members.

Notable alumni
 Chris Hubert, football player
 Dareke Young, NFL wide receiver

References

Schools in Wake County, North Carolina
Buildings and structures in Cary, North Carolina
Public high schools in North Carolina